The Charles A. Lindbergh Chair in Aerospace History, also known as the Lindbergh Chair,  is a one-year senior fellowship hosted by the U.S. National Air and Space Museum (NASM), to assist a scholar in the research and composition of a book about aerospace history. Named for the famous aviator Charles Lindbergh, the position is competitive: one experienced scholar is selected each year from multiple applicants worldwide. Up to $100,000 is granted to the winner.

The Lindbergh Chair is one of four research fellowships administered by NASM within the Smithsonian Institution: the others are the Daniel and Florence Guggenheim Fellowship, the A. Verville Fellowship, and the Postdoctoral Earth and Planetary Sciences Fellowship. Announced in 1977 at the 50th anniversary of Lindbergh's famous solo flight, 1978 was the first year that the Lindbergh Chair was occupied—British aviation historian Charles Harvard Gibbs-Smith was selected as the first recipient.

Each Lindbergh Chair application is judged relative to the suitability of its proposal, the scholarly record of the applicant, the availability of relevant museum staff advisors knowledgeable on the proposed topic, whether the NASM can provide the specific resources, and the applicability of the proposal to NASM's work-in-progress series. The winner is expected to reside in the Washington, D.C., area for nine months to a year, the academic year generally starting in September and ending by the following August. He or she is also expected to take part in discussions with museum staff and to attend professional seminars and colloquia. Along with access to primary research materials, the winner is given the use of an office, a phone and a computer.

Past winners

References

Awards established in 1977
Fellowships
Smithsonian Institution research programs
Scholarships in the United States
History of science awards
Charles Lindbergh